Peter M Lambert (born 3 December 1986) is a British rower who won two World Championships medals and three European Championship medals for Great Britain.

Rowing career
Lambert competed at the 2013 World Rowing Championships in Chungju, where he won a bronze medal as part of the quad sculls with Graeme Thomas, Sam Townsend and Charles Cousins. The following year he competed at the 2014 World Rowing Championships in Bosbaan, Amsterdam, where he won a silver medal as part of the quadruple sculls with Thomas, Townsend and Cousins.

References

External links
 

1986 births
Living people
British male rowers
Rowers from Johannesburg
World Rowing Championships medalists for Great Britain
Olympic rowers of Great Britain
Rowers at the 2016 Summer Olympics